The Defence Medical Academy is based at DMS Whittington. It is the training centre of Defence Medical Services. It trains military personnel to deal with situations that civilian paramedics would be involved with; i.e. more advanced situations than those which just require first aid.

History
The organization was formed as the Defence Medical Services Training Centre from the medical training centres for the three services at Keogh Barracks in 1996 and was initially subordinate to the Defence Medical Training Organisation. It became subordinate to the Royal Centre for Defence Medicine in 2008 and moved to Whittington Barracks as the Defence College of Healthcare Education and Training in 2014. It was renamed the Defence Medical Academy in September 2019.

Structure

The college is a Ministry of Defence Agency that provides Phase 2 training for medical personnel for all three armed forces (Combat Medical Technicians - CMTs and Medical Assistants - MAs), excluding that for medical doctors (from university medical schools). It trains the:
 Army Medical Services
 Royal Navy Medical Service
 RAF Medical Services

The Museum of Military Medicine is still based at Keogh Barracks.

Commandants

Commandants of the Royal Army Medical Corps Training Centre
Brigadier Desmond Murphy (1970 to 1973)
Brigadier Richard Bradshaw (1973 to 1975)
Colonel Geoffrey Banks (c.1985 to c.1988)

See also
 Royal Centre for Defence Medicine in Birmingham
 Medical Supplies Agency, based at Ludgershall, Wiltshire
 Defence School of Health Care Studies - trains nurses

Notes

References

External links
 History of defence medical training in the UK

Borough of Guildford
Education in Staffordshire
Health in Staffordshire
Health in Surrey
Lichfield District
Medical and health organisations based in England
Medical education in the United Kingdom
Military history of Staffordshire
Military medicine in the United Kingdom
Military training establishments of the United Kingdom
Organisations based in Staffordshire
Organisations based in Surrey
Royal Army Medical Corps